Thomas Gordon Ricketts Jr. (born November 21, 1965) is a former professional American football offensive tackle in the  National Football League (NFL). He played for five seasons for the Pittsburgh Steelers, the Indianapolis Colts, and the Kansas City Chiefs.

External links
NFL.com player page

1965 births
Living people
American football offensive tackles
Players of American football from Pittsburgh
Pittsburgh Panthers football players
Pittsburgh Steelers players
Indianapolis Colts players
Kansas City Chiefs players